State Highway 330 (SH 330) is a state highway in Mesa County, Colorado. SH 330's western terminus is at SH 65 north of Mesa, and the eastern terminus is at Grove Creek Road in Collbran.

Route description
SH 330 runs , starting at a junction with SH 65, heading east past Molina and ending at Grove Creek Road in Collbran. In 1995, the estimated traffic volume was 1050 vehicles per day near Molina and 1650 vehicles per day near Plateau City.

Major intersections

See also

 List of state highways in Colorado

References

External links

330
Transportation in Mesa County, Colorado